Robert Guy Torricelli (born August 27, 1951) is an American attorney and former politician.
A Democrat, Torricelli served as a member of the U.S. House of Representatives from New Jersey's 9th district from 1983 to 1997 and as a United States senator from New Jersey from 1997 to 2003.

He is notable for his tenure as chair of the Democratic Senatorial Campaign Committee. In September 2002, Torricelli ended his Senate re-election campaign after having been formally admonished by the U.S. Senate in connection with a campaign finance scandal. He later founded Rosemont Associates, a consulting group.

Early life and education
Torricelli was born in Paterson, New Jersey, the son of Betty (Lotz), a school librarian, and Salvatore Torricelli, a lawyer. After graduation from Storm King School in Cornwall-on-Hudson, New York, Torricelli attended Rutgers University, New Brunswick where he received his Bachelor of Arts degree in 1974. He then earned his J.D. degree in 1977 from Rutgers Law School in Newark. He was admitted to the New Jersey bar in 1978 and later attended Harvard University's John F. Kennedy School of Government, earning a master's in public administration in 1980.

Career
Torricelli was an assistant to the Governor of New Jersey, Brendan Byrne, from 1975 to 1977. In 1978, he served as associate counsel to Vice President Walter Mondale, and managed the Carter-Mondale campaign in the Illinois primary. At the 1980 Democratic National Convention, he served as the director of the Rules Committee.

U.S. House of Representatives
In 1982, Torricelli ran for U.S. Congress, defeating incumbent Republican Harold Hollenbeck. Torricelli served in the U.S. House of Representatives from 1983 until 1997 representing New Jersey's 9th congressional district.

Toricelli was a resident of New Milford, New Jersey during his first term in Congress.

Torricelli was Democratic floor leader in the Persian Gulf War discussion regarding the adoption of the "Authorization for Use of Military Force Against Iraq Resolution" in 1991 and gave the closing speech. 

In 1988, Torricelli visited Cuba and stated, "Living standards are not high, but the homelessness, hunger and disease that is witnessed in much of Latin America does not appear evident." He sponsored the Cuban Democracy Act of 1992 which prohibits U.S. trade with Cuba. Torricelli stated that the act would "wreak havoc on that island." Academic Helen Yafee writes that between Toricelli's 1988 visit and the 1992 Act, he received significant campaign contributions from the Cuban American National Foundation.

He was chairman of the House subcommittee on the Western Hemisphere.

Senate
Torricelli was elected to the U.S. Senate in 1996, defeating Republican Congressman Dick Zimmer to obtain the seat vacated by the retirement of Democratic Senator Bill Bradley. It was later found that six donors had made illegal contributions to Torricelli's campaign. In 2000, he headed the Democratic Senatorial Campaign Committee which regained the Democratic majority in the Senate. Torricelli was responsible for recruiting Senate candidates including Hillary Clinton.

A federal criminal investigation into Torricelli was dropped in early 2002. In the summer of 2002, however, Torricelli received a formal letter of admonishment from the U.S. Senate Select Committee on Ethics following an investigation into his alleged receipt of improper gifts from campaign donor David Chang. Chang had pleaded guilty to violating federal election laws. Torricelli apologized to voters for his behavior and delivered a speech in which he promised to take "'full personal responsibility'" for his actions. On September 30, 2002, Torricelli ended his 2002 re-election campaign after Republicans "successfully made the incumbent's ethics troubles -- stemming from illegal 1996 campaign donations and questionable gifts -- a campaign issue..." Shortly thereafter, the New Jersey Supreme Court unanimously ruled that the Democratic Party could legally replace Torricelli's name on the ballot with that of former U.S. Senator Frank Lautenberg.

In 2007, Torricelli drew public criticism despite federal rules allowing retired officials to give leftover campaign funds to political parties, candidates and charities when his leftover campaign funds, given to the Rosemont Foundation, were not funneled back to his political party.

During his time in the Senate, Torricelli was a member of the Governmental Affairs Committee, the Finance Committee, and the Rules Committee.

Post-congressional career
In 2003, Torricelli was appointed by the U.S. Federal District Court as special master overseeing the environmental cleanup project of the Mutual Chemical site In Jersey City, New Jersey, owned by the Honeywell Corporation.

Torricelli founded business and government affairs consulting firm Rosemont Associates. He is a partner in real estate firm Woodrose Properties, which is invested in over 50 multi family or commercial properties in 10 states. Torricelli has represented the Iranian opposition group, the MEK.

Personal life
Torricelli was married to Susan Holloway and has dated Bianca Jagger.

Bibliography

See also
List of federal political scandals in the United States

References

External links

CNN report on Torricelli dropping out of Senate race.

|-

|-

|-

|-

1951 births
21st-century American politicians
American lobbyists
American United Methodists
Democratic Party United States senators from New Jersey
Harvard Kennedy School alumni
Living people
Democratic Party members of the United States House of Representatives from New Jersey
New Jersey lawyers
People from New Milford, New Jersey
Politicians from Paterson, New Jersey
Rutgers School of Law–Newark alumni
American people of Italian descent
Storm King School alumni
Members of Congress who became lobbyists